The  is a dual-voltage AC/DC outer-suburban electric multiple unit (EMU) train type operated by West Japan Railway Company (JR West) and third-sector railway operators IR Ishikawa Railway and Ainokaze Toyama Railway on local services in the Fukui and Kanazawa areas since November 2006.

Design
The 521 series was the first dual-voltage suburban EMU type to be built for JR West. The body of the first two batches was based on the 223-5000 series suburban EMU design, with the same WMT102C 230 kW traction motors. The sets are able to be used on wanman driver-only operation services.

Operations

JR West
 521-0 series
 Hokuriku Main Line ( - )
 Kosei Line ( - )
 Obama Line ( - , sometimes substituted for 125 series)
 521-100 series
 Nanao Line (from 3 October 2020)

Third-sector lines
 IR Ishikawa Railway Line
 Ainokaze Toyama Railway Line
 Echigo Tokimeki Railway Nihonkai Hisui Line

Fleet
, JR West operates 50 two-car sets (E01-E05, G14-G15, G17, G20-G24, G28-G30, J01-J19, U01-U15), allocated to Kanazawa depot and Tsuruga depot. The Ainokaze Toyama Railway operates 22 two-car sets (AK01-AK22), and the IR Ishikawa Railway operates five two-car sets (IR01-IR05).

19 third-batch two-car sets (J01 to J19) were delivered to Tsuruga Depot in fiscal 2013. The third-batch sets have cab ends based on the JR West 225 series EMUs, with improved crash resistance, and use LED lighting for interior lighting. These sets entered revenue service in spring 2014.

Formations
Sets consist of one motored and one non-powered trailer car, and are formed as follows.

The KuHa 520 cars are each fitted with one WPD28D single-arm pantograph.

Interior
Seating is arranged as 2+2 abreast transverse flip-over seats. The KuHa 520 cars include a toilet.

History
The first five sets, E01 to E05, were built by Kawasaki Heavy Industries and Kinki Sharyo, and were delivered to Fukui depot between September and October 2006. These entered revenue service from 30 November 2006. The fleet was reallocated to Tsuruga Depot from 1 June 2010.

Ten more sets, G01 to G10, built by Kinki Sharyo, were delivered to Kanazawa depot between October 2009 and March 2010, entering revenue service from 13 March 2010. A further five sets, G11 to G15, were delivered from Kawasaki Heavy Industries in December 2010 and January 2011. 15 more sets, M01 to M15, were delivered from Kawasaki Heavy Industries to Tsuruga Depot between January and March 2011.

Other operators
16 two-car 521 series sets were transferred to the third-sector railway operating company Ainokaze Toyama Railway for use from 14 March 2015 when JR West handed over ownership of the sections of the Hokuriku Main Line in Toyama Prefecture running parallel to the new Hokuriku Shinkansen. Likewise, three two-car sets were transferred to the IR Ishikawa Railway, which took over control of the section of the Hokuriku Main Line in Ishikawa Prefecture from 14 March 2015. Two more sets were newly built for the IR Ishikawa Railway.

Ainokaze Toyama Railway

, the Ainokaze Toyama Railway 521 series fleet is as follows.

Five new two-car 521-1000 series sets are scheduled to be introduced over a period of six years, with the first set delivered in December 2017. These sets are based on the JR West 3rd-batch design, and are intended to replace the operator's ageing 413 series EMUs. 

Sets AK21 and AK22 were delivered in February 2023.

IR Ishikawa Railway 

, the IR Ishikawa Railway 521 series fleet is as follows.

References

Further reading

External links

 JR West 521 series (Japan Railfan Magazine) 

Electric multiple units of Japan
West Japan Railway Company
Train-related introductions in 2006
20 kV AC multiple units
Kawasaki multiple units
Kinki Sharyo multiple units
1500 V DC multiple units of Japan